A Vava Inouva is the successful 1991 album by Idir, a Kabyle singer. It contains a big international hit in the title track, which was also his debut single. It also contains other very important hits by him such as "Azwaw", "Zwit Rwit" (the origin for Khaled's "El harba wine), "Ssendu" and "Cfiy"

Song: "A Vava Inouva"
"A Vava Inouva", is the title track from the album. It was originally "A Baba-inu Ba" alternatively A baba inuba meaning "Ô mon père Inuba" (Oh, my father Inuba), and is a fine example of Kabyle music.

"A Vava Inouva" was a lullaby composed by Idir and Ben Mohamed (real name Mohamed Benhamadouche) and was written for Nouara, a singer on Radio Algiers. However upon non acceptance by Nouara, Idir decided to interpret the song himself accompanied by the singer Mila. 

The lullaby song was an immediate success, making it arguably the best-known song in the Kabyle language internationally and a great commercial success.

Many other versions exist such as the 1999 version with Karen Matheson, ; a singer with a great repertoire of Gaelic songs. That version appeared in Idir's album Identités.

"A Vava Inouva", which was originally released in 1976, has also been since translated into several languages, including Arabic, Spanish, French, Greek and others. David Jisse and Dominique Marge released as a duo the French version "Ouvre-moi vite la porte". Yiannis Katevas released a Greek version as "An ginotane" (in Greek Αν γινότανε) featuring Efi Strati.

Track list

 A Vava Inouva
 Isefra
 Ssendu
 Azger
 Muqleɣ
 Zwit Rwit
 Cfiɣ
 Azwaw
 Tagrawla
 Tiɣri b ugdud
 Acawi
 Ay Arrac Nneɣ
 Cteduɣi
 Izumal
 L'Mut
 W' Ibɣun
 Aɣrib

Personnel
Idir – vocal, guitar, percussion
Omar Meguenni – guitar, bass, vocal
Gerard Geoffroy – flute
Andrée Ceccarelli – drums
Jean Musy – moog

1991 debut albums